The Diocese of British Columbia, also known as the Anglican Diocese of Islands and Inlets, is a diocese of the Ecclesiastical Province of British Columbia and Yukon of the Anglican Church of Canada.

Despite the name, the diocese comprises only the 32,630 square kilometres of Vancouver Island and the adjacent Gulf Islands in the civil Province of British Columbia. Its see city is Victoria, and it presently maintains 45 parishes serving nearly 7,000 Anglicans according to the most recent statistics published by the ACC.

The diocese was established in 1859, and is the oldest in the ecclesiastical province, once extending over the entire civil province of British Columbia, hence the origin of its name. Its first bishop was George Hills. In 1866, there were two archdeaconries: H. P. Wright was Archdeacon of Columbia and Samuel Gilson of Vancouver. Notable parishes include Christ Church Cathedral and the Church of St. John the Divine, both in Victoria. The current bishop is the Right Reverend Anna Greenwood-Lee.

As part of the diocese's commitments to making indigenous land acknowledgements, the diocese around June 2021 began replacing its formal name referencing the colonial identity of British Columbia with the alternative name Anglican Diocese of Islands and Inlets on its website, in its newsletters, and other publicity materials.

Bishops of British Columbia

Further reading

Anglican Church of Canada, Anglican Church Directory, 2007. Anglican Book Centre, 2006.

References

External links
Diocesan website

Religious organizations established in 1859
British Columbia, Anglican Diocese of
Organizations based in Victoria, British Columbia
Anglican dioceses established in the 19th century
1859 establishments in the British Empire
1859 establishments in Canada
Anglican Province of British Columbia and Yukon